Pubblico was an Italian daily newspaper briefly published in Italy between September and December 2012.

History 
Pubblico was first published on 18 September 2012. The founders were Luca Telese who was also its editor and a group of fellow journalists. The paper was a full-colour left-wing publication. The graphics and logo of the paper were similar to French paper Libération. Pubblicos slogan was “Not funded by public money”.

Following the launch the publication failed to reach to break-even of an average of 9600 copies sold, and the publisher went immediately in financial difficulties. After a failed attempt to recapitalize the publisher company in order to save it, Pubblico ceased the publication on 31 December 2012.

Editorial staff

Editors
 Luca Telese (2012)

Columnists
Luca Telese
Federico Mello
Manolo Fuce
Francesca Fornario
Stefania Podda
Stella Prudente
Fabio Luppino
Roberto Brunelli
Tommaso Labate
Ritanna Armeni
Giancarlo Padovan
Corrado Formigli

References

External links 
  

2012 establishments in Italy
2012 disestablishments in Italy
Magazines established in 2012
Publications disestablished in 2012
Defunct newspapers published in Italy
Daily newspapers published in Italy
Italian-language newspapers
Newspapers published in Rome